James Craig, 2nd Viscount Craigavon (2 March 1906 – 18 May 1974), was a British hereditary peer who sat in the House of Lords.

He was the son of James Craig, 1st Viscount Craigavon, first Prime Minister of Northern Ireland and Cecil Mary Nowell Dering Craig. He succeeded to his father's peerage upon his death in 1940.

He was educated at Eton College and served in the Royal Navy. He later worked as a Liaison and Entertainments Officer on the Orient Line and the Peninsular and Oriental Steam Navigation Company on its Liner, Cruise and Round World Voyages. Lord Craigavon was married to Angela Fiona Tatchell (daughter of Percy Tatchell, MRCS) (1918-2007) and had three children:

Issue

The Hon. Janitha Stormont Craig (born 31 August 1940) in 1965 married Gordon Robert MacInnes, eldest son of Robert Wood MacInnes, of Ruislip and has issue.
Avila MacInnes (born 19 October 1967)
Córdova MacInnes (born 10 December 1972)
Jimena MacInnes (born 20 March 1975)
The Rt. Hon. Janric Fraser Craig, 3rd Viscount Craigavon
The Hon. Jacaranda Fiona Craig (born 8 January 1949) in 1972 married Dudley Francis Macdonald, of 26 Paroman Towers, George Street, London W1 and has issue. They divorced in 1983.
Toby James Francis Macdonald (born 19 August 1975)
Rose Carole Macdonald (born 18 January 1978)

Arms

References

External links

1906 births
1974 deaths
People educated at Eton College
Ulster Scots people
Viscounts in the Peerage of the United Kingdom